Temple Tower was the sixth Bulldog Drummond novel. It was published in 1929 and written by H. C. McNeile under the pen name Sapper. It was adapted into the 1930 film Temple Tower.

References

Bibliography

 

1929 British novels
British crime novels
British novels adapted into films
English novels
Hodder & Stoughton books